23rd U-boat Flotilla ("23. Unterseebootsflottille") was a unit of Nazi Germany's Kriegsmarine during World War II.

The flotilla was first formed in Salamis, Greece, on 11 September 1941 under the command of Kapitänleutnant Fritz Frauenheim. In May 1942 the flotilla was merged into 29th U-boat Flotilla, based at La Spezia, Italy.

The flotilla was re-founded in September 1943 as a Training Flotilla under the command of Korvettenkapitän Otto von Bülow, based at Danzig. It trained new U-boat commanders in attack techniques (Kommandantenschiesslehrgang, "Commanders shooting training course"). The flotilla was disbanded in March 1945.

Assigned U-boats
Nine U-boats were assigned to this flotilla during its combat service in 1941–1942.

References 

23
Military units and formations established in 1941
Military units and formations established in 1943
Military units and formations disestablished in 1942
Military units and formations disestablished in 1945
Salamis Island
German occupation of Greece during World War II